In retail marketing, an endcap or end cap is a display for a product placed at the end of an aisle. It is perceived to give a brand a competitive advantage.  It is often available for lease to a manufacturer in a retail environment.  Products placed on an endcap for sale will sell at a much faster pace than products not on the endcap.  The display of products on the endcap is sometimes also called a feature.

Promotional shelves and retail fixtures

In addition to products displayed on the end of an aisle, promoted space on a retail shelf can be referred to as a fixtures. Companies will oftentimes purchase a smaller amount of shelf space before making the move to an endcap at the end of an aisle.

Construction
End caps are often built into the shelving or racks of the retail aisle system.  Other retailers have an open space at the end of the aisle;  an end cap is placed in that space, often on a pallet.  Several design options are available.

Some endcaps are refrigerated. Most endcaps are made of printed  corrugated fiberboard which is readily recyclable. Corrugated plastic is also used.   Many endcaps and point of purchase displays are assembled by contract packagers.

See also
 Gondola (retail)
Visual merchandising
Display stand

References

 Yam, K.L., "Encyclopedia of Packaging Technology", John Wiley & Sons, 2009,

External links
The Price of a Retail Endcap

Retail store elements
Packaging